Morris Leon Radoff (January 10, 1905 – December 2, 1978) was the second state archivist of Maryland, serving from 1939 to 1975.

Radoff was born and raised in a Jewish home in Houston, Texas, and completed his undergraduate studies at the University of Houston. He earned a master's degree at North Carolina University and a Ph.D. in Romance languages and literature at Johns Hopkins University in Baltimore, Maryland.

After receiving his doctorate, Radoff worked as a university lecturer and historical editor in Maryland before being appointed state archivist in 1939. In 1953, Radoff was also appointed the state records administrator, an office he held until his retirement from the Archives in 1975.

Radoff's contributions to the archives profession also included service as president of the Society of American Archivists (SAA), serving from 1954 to 1955.

References

American archivists
Maryland State Archives personnel
University of Houston alumni
University of North Carolina alumni
Johns Hopkins University alumni
Jewish American historians
People from Houston
1905 births
1978 deaths
Historians from Texas
20th-century American Jews